The Plataforma Deltana (English: Deltana Platform) is an offshore oil and gas field straddling the maritime borders of Trinidad and Tobago and Venezuela. It is located in the Orinoco delta, about 90 kilometers northeast of the island Tobejuba in the state  Delta Amacuro, and approximately 233 kilometers southeast of Güiria, Sucre State, Venezuela.

Water Depths and  Topography of Bottom

The water depths range from about 66 meters in the southwest up to 308 meters in the northeast, with an average slope of approximately 0.4% (0.25 grades) to the east-northeast.  The relief of the seabed is generally irregular and includes frequent scarps related with faulting and erosion.

Geology

The seabed in general is composed mainly of very soft clays. The geologic features in this area include normal faults with northwest-southeast orientation, a system of exposed and buried reefs that cross the area from the

northwest toward the southeast, gas pockets trapped in faults and shallow strata at different levels of depth, paleo-channels, abrupt erosional slopes and scarps associated with submarine debris flows and faulting.  Several side scan sonar  targets are interpreted as scattered small debris.

See also

List of oil fields

References 

Eastern Venezuela Basin
Geography of Delta Amacuro
Oil fields of Venezuela